Oorakam Mala is a mount near Malappuram, Kerala, India. It is in the Oorakam village, bordering the Nediyiruppu and Kannamangalam villages. It is visible from the Malappuram-Parappanangadi state highway between Vengara and Panakkad and is around 6 km to the peak of the mount from the highway. There is a Jain temple at the top of the mountain, which is around 2000 years old.

Geography of Malappuram district
Mountains of Kerala